Jiří Polívka (born March 2, 1974 in Hradec Králové) is a Czech sprint canoer who competed from the mid-1990s to the early 2000s (decade). At the 1996 Summer Olympics in Atlanta, he was eliminated in the semifinals of the K-2 500 m and K-4 1000 m events. Four years later in Sydney, Polívka was eliminated in the semifinals of the K-4 1000 m event.

References
 Sports-Reference.com profile

1974 births
Canoeists at the 1996 Summer Olympics
Canoeists at the 2000 Summer Olympics
Czech male canoeists
Living people
Olympic canoeists of the Czech Republic
Sportspeople from Hradec Králové